An Occurrence at Owl Creek Bridge is a 1961 French short film, almost without dialogue. It was based on the 1891 American short story of the same name by American Civil War soldier, wit, and writer Ambrose Bierce. It was directed by Robert Enrico and produced by Marcel Ichac and Paul de Roubaix with music by Henri Lanoë. It won awards at the Cannes Film Festival and the Academy Awards. The film was later screened on American television as episode 22 of the fifth season of The Twilight Zone on 28 February 1964.

Plot
A handbill posted on a burnt tree, dated 1862, announces that anyone interfering with bridges, railroads or tunnels will be summarily executed. Union troops prepare a civilian prisoner, Peyton Farquhar, for death by hanging from a rural railroad bridge. The soundtrack contains only bird noises and brief military orders. As the rope is adjusted about Farquhar's neck, a vision of his home, wife and children flashes before him.

As Farquhar falls, the rope breaks, and he drops into the river. In an underwater sequence he frees himself from his bonds, kicks his boots free and swims downstream as soldiers fire at him. Farquhar is swept through rapids and crawls ashore exhausted but laughing with relief. Glimpses of tree branches, sky and crawling insects are interrupted by a distant cannon shot which sends him running through a forest, then along a linear and orderly lane. Finally arriving at the gates of his home, he pushes his way through foliage. Farquhar reaches open lawn and runs toward his wife as she walks toward him, smiling and weeping.

Just as the couple are about to fall into each other's arms, Farquhar stiffens and gasps, and his head snaps back. The scene cuts back to his body hanging from the bridge, his entire escape and reunion with his wife revealed to be an illusion experienced in the moment of the drop.

Twilight Zone airing
Three years after its production, the film was shown on American TV slightly shortened on February 28, 1964 as part of season 5 of the fantasy/science fiction show The Twilight Zone. Producer William Froug had seen the film and decided to buy the rights to broadcast it on American television. 

The episode's introduction is notable for Rod Serling breaking the fourth wall even more than usual, as he explains how the film was shot overseas and later picked up to air as part of The Twilight Zone. The introduction by Rod Serling is as follows:

Serling's closing narration states:

The transaction cost The Twilight Zone $25,000, significantly less than the average of $65,000 they expended on producing their own episodes; however, Froug's purchase allowed for the film to be aired only twice. Consequently, it is not included on The Twilight Zone's syndication package, though it is included with the series on home video releases. Marc Scott Zicree's The Twilight Zone Companion incorrectly states the French film was purchased for $10,000. This mistake has been reprinted in a number of books since the 1984 publication. The Twilight Zone: Unlocking the Door to a Television Classic by Martin Grams correctly verifies the purchase price as $20,000 plus $5,000 additional costs for re-editing.

According to Zicree, "An Occurrence at Owl Creek Bridge" was the last episode of the classic Twilight Zone to be "produced" (presumably referencing the re-editing and the addition of footage of Rod Serling, as production of the series was cancelled afterwards). It was not, however, the last episode of the series to be broadcast.

Awards
 1962 Cannes Film Festival: Best Short Subject
 1963 Academy Award, Best Live Action Short Film

Preservation
An Occurrence at Owl Creek Bridge was preserved by the Academy Film Archive in 2012.

References

Barrett, Gerald R. (1973). From Fiction to Film: An Occurrence at Owl Creek Bridge. Encino, CA: Dickenson Publishing. .
DeVoe, Bill. (2008). Trivia from The Twilight Zone. Albany, GA: Bear Manor Media. 
Grams, Martin. (2008). The Twilight Zone: Unlocking the Door to a Television Classic. Churchville, MD: OTR Publishing.

External links
 
 

1961 films
1961 short films
French short films
French black-and-white films
1961 drama films
American Civil War films
Television episodes about the American Civil War
1964 American television episodes
The Twilight Zone (1959 TV series season 5) episodes
Live Action Short Film Academy Award winners
Films about capital punishment
Films directed by Robert Enrico
Short Film Palme d'Or winners
Films based on short fiction
Films set in 1862
1960s English-language films
1960s American films